is a Japanese volleyball player. She plays for the Japan women's national volleyball team. She competed at the 2020 Summer Olympics, in Women's volleyball,.

Career 
She participated in the 2015 FIVB Volleyball Girls' U18 World Championship, 2018 Asian Women's Volleyball Cup and 2021 FIVB Volleyball Women's Nations League.

She plays for JT Marvelous, who placed first in the 2019–20 V.League Division 1 Women's.

References

External links 
 Japan v China - Women's International Volleyball Game

Living people
1999 births
Japanese women's volleyball players
Volleyball players at the 2020 Summer Olympics
Olympic volleyball players of Japan